Louis d'Ambrosio (21 June 1879 – 1946) was a French sculptor. His work was part of the sculpture event in the art competition at the 1928 Summer Olympics.

References

1879 births
1946 deaths
20th-century French sculptors
20th-century French male artists
French male sculptors
Olympic competitors in art competitions
People from Lazio